Saros cycle series 155 for lunar eclipses occurs at the moon's descending node, repeats every 18 years 11 and 1/3 days. It contains 73 events (44 events before 3000).

This lunar saros is linked to Solar Saros 162.

See also 
 List of lunar eclipses
 List of Saros series for lunar eclipses

Notes

External links 
 www.hermit.org: Saros 155

Lunar saros series